Ishta is a 2011 Kannada-language romance film directed by R.P. Krishna and produced by RMV Combines. The film is Bhoomika Chabria's and Santosh Swarbi's debut film. The film was released on 21 October 2011.

Cast 
Santhosh as Krishna
Bhoomika as Nanda
Ravi Teja as Ravi

Reception

Critical response 

A critic from The New Indian Express wrote "The main disadvantage is the absence of humour which is required to break the monotony. The scene where Honnavalli Krishna attempts to enter a temple premises in an inebriated condition fails to impress even the front benchers. All in all, one needs a lot of patience to watch this flick". B S Srivani from Deccan Herald wrote "Santosh, with already a few films under the belt, is good as Bandi Krishna. Bhoomika takes a while to grow on the audience, but projects hauteur very well. Someone with a more mature voice would have helped her performance.Ishta starts off with immense potential only to fritter it all away at the altar of commercial requirement". A critic from News18 India wrote "The supporting cast is equally mediocre. Technical work is below average except for the background score which is fairly decent. 'Ishta' could have been a pleasing film but the director's haphazard work spoils the show".

References

2011 films
2010s Kannada-language films